Paul H. Tobias (also known as Paul Edward Huge (pronounced hugh-gee); born in August 1963, Indianapolis, Indiana) is an American guitarist best known for his involvement with hard rock band Guns N' Roses, with whom he has collaborated since 1994.

Guns N' Roses
The first known collaborations by Tobias and childhood friend Axl Rose can be traced back to 1984 and the formation of Hollywood Rose. The band's demo tape featured two songs co-written by Rose and Tobias: "Shadow of Your Love" and "Back Off Bitch".

In 1985, Rose formed Guns N' Roses. Several tracks on the band's debut album, Appetite for Destruction, were written beforehand and originally intended for earlier projects. While the Hollywood Rose track "Shadow of Your Love" was re-recorded during these sessions, it didn't make it to the album. It was released as a B-side of the album's first single, "It's So Easy/Mr. Brownstone". Tobias was thanked in the album's credits.

The third Guns N' Roses studio album, Use Your Illusion I, featuring a re-recorded version of "Back Off Bitch", was released in 1991. At the time, Rose stated in an interview that the song was roughly ten years old.

In late 1994, Tobias replaced Gilby Clarke and played rhythm and lead guitar on the band's cover version of Rolling Stones' "Sympathy for the Devil". While Tobias contributed to the song on Rose's request, his inclusion is known to have caused friction between Rose and the band's then-lead guitarist Slash, because of an overdub made by Tobias of Slash's solo on the song.

Tobias is known to have worked and recorded with Guns N' Roses in 1996, when the band started working on their sixth studio album. His role in the band was not clarified publicly at the time. According to Rose, this was due to the uncertainty on whether Tobias would eventually be featured on the record and subsequent tours as a rhythm guitarist. Former band members Slash and drummer Matt Sorum have publicly stated that Tobias's involvement strengthened their respective decisions to resign from Guns N' Roses.

"The public gets a different story from the other guys – Slash, Duff, Matt – who have their own agendas. The original intentions between Paul and myself were that Paul was going to help me for as long as it took to get this thing together in whatever capacity that he could help me in. So when he first was brought into this, he was brought in as a writer to work with Slash."

In 1997, Tobias began working for Guns N' Roses full-time in a studio setting, jamming and recording song ideas with keyboardist Dizzy Reed and former lead guitarist Robin Finck, among others. During this time Tobias and Reed wrote a song called "Oh My God". In 1999, the band recorded the song and released it on the soundtrack of the Arnold Schwarzenegger film End of Days.

In January 2001, when Guns N' Roses played their first concerts in eight years at Las Vegas's House of Blues and Rock in Rio III, Rose introduced Tobias on stage in both shows as someone who had helped him in keeping the band together during the past years. In Las Vegas, Rose also noted that Tobias had previously played live in only a handful of shows. The band would play their next two concerts in December 2001, again in Las Vegas. They proved to be Tobias' last appearances as a band member.

In mid-2002, due to his aversion to touring, Tobias was replaced in the band by Richard Fortus. At the time it was not officially stated that Tobias had left Guns N' Roses, although neither his name or work was mentioned for several years. When the band released Chinese Democracy in 2008 it became evident that despite his lack of touring, he had recorded several guitar and piano pieces and wrote songs for the album along with the other band members, and featured heavily on the final product.

Mank Rage
In 2002, Tobias' band Mank Rage (David Lank, Darren Mickler and several past drummers) expressed interest in releasing an album, consisting of material recorded prior to his tenure with Guns N' Roses. In July 2006, nearly four years later, a MySpace account featuring three of the band's demos was opened.

Other work
Tobias worked with former Guns N' Roses drummer Brain on several tracks of production music for an album called Eclectic Cinema. The album also features Guns N' Roses and Buckethead collaborator Pete Scaturro and future Guns N' Roses keyboardist Melissa Reese.

References

External links
Mank Rage on MySpace
Huge Hits: A Guns N' Roses Playlist

1963 births
20th-century American guitarists
American male guitarists
American rock guitarists
Guitarists from Indiana
Guns N' Roses members
Living people
Rhythm guitarists